In physics, Rosser's equation aids in understanding the role of displacement current in Maxwell's equations, given that there is no aether in empty space as initially assumed by Maxwell. Due originally to William G.V. Rosser, the equation was labeled by Selvan:

Equation 

Rosser's Equation is given by the following:

where:
 is the conduction-current density,
 is the transverse current density,
 is time, and
 is the scalar potential.

Given these, the following standard Maxwell relations hold:

The term  is the displacement current that Selvan notes is "hidden away" in Rosser's Equation. Selvan (ibid.) quotes Rosser himself as follows:

References 

Electrodynamics